Eduardo Mac Entyre (20 February 1929 – 5 May 2014) was an Argentine artist known for his geometric paintings.

Born in Buenos Aires, Argentina to a Scottish father and Belgian mother, Mac Entyre began pursuing his talent for sketches at the age of twenty. Studying standards like Albrecht Dürer, Hans Holbein and Rembrandt, he later began exploring impressionist and cubist influences and his work was first displayed in 1954 at Buenos Aires' Comte Art Gallery.

Calling the attention of local arts patron Ignacio Pirovano and Buenos Aires Museum of Modern Art Director Rafael Squirru following a 1959 show at the renowned Peuser Art Gallery, Mac Entyre's work soon earned him a following among several of the city's other accomplished abstract artists, resulting in a genre they themselves described as Generative art, a movement later expanded on by world-renowned computer artists like Benoît Mandelbrot.

Sketched until relatively recently by hand following a series of random algorithms, Mac Entyre's work is reminiscent of Leonardo Fibonacci's 13th-century nautilus designsthough Mac Entyre's are more complex owing to their randomness, as each work forms a helix alike in no two sketches. Mac Entyre created a body of more traditional Abstract, Cubist and Figurative art. He was honored by the Organization of American States in 1986 for his contribution to Modern  Art in Latin America.

References

External links
Angel Guido Art Gallery

Argentine painters
Argentine male painters
1929 births
2014 deaths
Argentine people of Scottish descent
Argentine people of Belgian descent
People from Buenos Aires
Place of death missing